Halton Old Hall is a house in the village of Halton in Runcorn, Cheshire, England.  It is recorded in the National Heritage List for England as a designated Grade II* listed building.  The house dates from 1693, and is built in sandstone with a slate roof.  It has two storeys and an attic; a two-storey wing has been added to the back.  The windows have mullions and the gables have corbels and copings.  Both Starkey and Nikolaus Pevsner note that its style is older than its date.

See also

Grade I and II* listed buildings in Halton (borough)
Listed buildings in Runcorn (urban area)

References

Grade II* listed buildings in Cheshire
Houses completed in 1693
Buildings and structures in Runcorn
1693 establishments in England